Oxytheca is a genus of plants in the family Polygonaceae with seven species found in dry and temperate parts of the Americas. The taxonomy of this genus is in flux, with some species often listed under tentative new names.

Species include:
Oxytheca dendroidea
Oxytheca parishii = Acanthoscyphus parishii
Oxytheca perfoliata
Oxytheca watsonii

References

External links 
 Jepson Manual Treatment
 USDA Plants Profile

Polygonaceae genera